Palookaville is a 1995 American crime comedy film directed by Alan Taylor (in his feature directorial debut) and written by David Epstein. The film is about a trio of burglars and their dysfunctional family of origin. It stars William Forsythe, Vincent Gallo, Adam Trese, and Frances McDormand. The writing is a free interpretation of three short stories by Italo Calvino.

Palookaville premiered at the Venice Film Festival on September 7, 1995, and was released theatrically in the United States on October 25, 1996, by The Samuel Goldwyn Company. It received mostly positive reviews from critics.

Plot 
Sid, Russ and Jerry are three wannabe criminals looking for easy money to break out of their nowhere lives. Despite a bungled jewelry store heist which exposes their incompetence, they are convinced they can pull off an armored-truck robbery. While plotting their caper, their dysfunctional families spin out of control all around them.

Cast

Reception

Critical response 
The review aggregator website Rotten Tomatoes reported an approval rating of 64%, with an average rating of 6.4/10, based on 11 reviews.

Roger Ebert of the Chicago Sun-Times gave the film 3 out of 4 stars.

Accolades 

 1995, nominated, Golden Alexander at the Thessaloniki Film Festival for director Alan Taylor
 1997, won, Audience Award at the Tromsø International Film Festival for director Alan Taylor
 1998, won, ALFS Award for British Producer of the Year at the London Critics Circle Film Awards for Uberto Pasolini

References

External links
 

1995 films
1990s crime comedy films
1990s heist films
American crime comedy films
American heist films
Films directed by Alan Taylor
Films scored by Rachel Portman
Films set in New Jersey
Films shot in New Jersey
The Samuel Goldwyn Company films
1995 directorial debut films
1995 comedy films
Adaptations of works by Italo Calvino
1990s English-language films
1990s American films
English-language crime comedy films